Benedicto Campos (October 27, 1912 in Quequen – February 8, 1972 in Chascomús) was an Argentine racing driver.

Argentine racing drivers
Grand Prix drivers
1912 births
1972 deaths